According to USGS GNIS, Mount Morrison may refer to one of four possible peaks in the United States:

It also refers to Mount Morrison in the Lost River Range of Idaho.

It may also refer to one of two mountains in Antarctica, in Enderby Land and Victoria Land.

It can also refer to Mount Morrison (Yushan), in Taiwan.